Dancing on the Edge is a British television drama written and directed by Stephen Poliakoff and produced by the BBC about a black jazz band in London in the early 1930s. The series aired on BBC Two between 4 February and 10 March 2013. It was nominated for three awards at the 71st Golden Globe Awards.

Plot
The series follows a black jazz band's experiences in London in the 1930s. Made up of talented musicians and managed by the compassionate yet short-tempered Wesley Holt, the band gets a booking at the Imperial Hotel, through cunning journalist Stanley Mitchell. They prove to be a hit, and become a success at the hotel. Aristocrats — and the Royal Family — ask the band to play at parties. The media rush to interview and photograph the band, who are also associated with the wealthy American businessman Walter Masterson and his enthusiastic British employee Julian. The band's success spirals, with them being offered record deals. But tragedy strikes, setting off a chain of events that may wreck the band's career.

Cast

The Louis Lester Band
 Chiwetel Ejiofor as Louis Lester: The band leader of the Louis Lester Band. Born in London, Louis travelled the world as an entertainer on cruise ships before returning to the UK.
 Angel Coulby as Jessie Taylor: The lead singer with the Louis Lester Band. Beautiful and with an amazing voice, she fascinates even royalty.
 Wunmi Mosaku as Carla: The shy backing vocalist for the Louis Lester Band and Jessie's best friend.
 Ariyon Bakare as Wesley Holt: The irascible manager of the Louis Lester Band. Although born in Cardiff, he has lived in Chicago for most of his life and lost his British birth certificate.

Music Express magazine
 Matthew Goode as Stanley Mitchell: A music journalist at Music Express magazine, who helps bring the band to public attention.
 Jenna Coleman as Rosie Williams: Stanley's assistant at the magazine.
 Sam Hoare as Eric: A new journalist at the magazine.
 Allan Corduner as Mr Wax: The owner of Music Express, who has little to do with the day-to-day operation of the magazine.

The Elite
 Jacqueline Bisset as Lavinia, Lady Cremone: A wealthy aristocrat who has become a recluse after the death of her sons in World War I.
 John Goodman as Walter Masterson: An American real estate mogul and one of the richest men in the world.
 Tom Hughes as Julian Luscombe: A debonair young man, who works as Mr Masterson's aide.
 Joanna Vanderham as Pamela Luscombe: Julian's sister and a playful, beautiful society girl.
 Janet Montgomery as Sarah Peters: A photographer and Pamela's best friend. She is the daughter of a Russian immigrant.
 Anthony Head as Arthur Donaldson: A wealthy and influential businessman.
 John Hopkins as Prince George, Duke of Kent: Son of the King George V.

Non-elite
 Mel Smith as Nathan Schlesinger: The manager of the Imperial Hotel.
 Miles Richardson as Harry Thornton: Mr Schlesinger's right-hand man at the Imperial.
 Maggie McCarthy as Mrs Mitchell: Stanley's mother.
 Caroline Quentin as Deirdre: The owner of a small music club.
 David Dawson as D.I. Horton: A police detective investigating a murder.
 Gerard Horan as D.I. Gunson: A police detective investigating a murder.

Episodes

Locations
Filming took place on location at the Grand Hotel and Council House in Birmingham, where the hotel scenes were shot, the Black Country Living Museum was used to shoot a scene set in a mining village and Ragley Hall in Warwickshire was used as Lady Cremone's home. The headquarters of Music Express are located at No. 4 Princelet Street, Spitalfields and later at Somerset House. The railway scenes in the first episode were shot on the preserved Bluebell Railway. Wilton's Music Hall was used as the club. Fenton House, Hampstead, stands for the house of Donaldson. Some scenes for Donaldson's house were also shot at Upton House, Warwickshire. Kidderminster, on the Severn Valley Railway, was used as "Folkestone" in the fifth episode. Manze's Eel, Pie and Mash shop in Walthamstow also makes an appearance in that episode.

Accolades

References

External links
 
 
 The Guardian, 4 February 2013: "Dancing on the Edge: what was life really like for black jazz bands in 1930s Britain?" Retrieved 2013-02-06

2010s British drama television series
2013 British television series debuts
2013 British television series endings
BBC Film films
BBC television dramas
2010s British television miniseries
English-language television shows
Television series set in the 1930s